Metropolitan Tower may refer to one of the following buildings:

Metropolitan Tower (Chicago), Chicago, Illinois, United States
Metropolitan Tower (New York), New York City, New York, United States
Metropolitan Tower (Youngstown), Youngstown, Ohio, United States
Metropolitan Life Insurance Company Tower, New York City